Savareh-ye Babakan (also Romanized as Savāreh-ye Bābakān; also known as Savāreh) is a village in Sepidar Rural District, in the Central District of Boyer-Ahmad County, Kohgiluyeh and Boyer-Ahmad Province, Iran. At the 2006 census, its population was 26, in 7 families.

References 

Populated places in Boyer-Ahmad County